Paranerita hyalinata is a moth of the subfamily Arctiinae. It was described by Paul Reich in 1933. It is found in Peru.

References

Paranerita
Moths described in 1933